Spathoglottis, commonly known as purple orchids or 苞舌兰属 (bao she lan shu) is a genus of about fifty species of orchids in the family Orchidaceae. They are evergreen terrestrial herbs with crowded pseudobulbs, a small number of leaves and medium-sized resupinate flowers on an upright flowering stem. The sepals and petals are all similar to each other and are white, yellow, pink or purple. Species of Spathoglottis are found from eastern and south-eastern Asia to Australia and some Pacific Islands.

Description
Orchids in the genus Spathoglottis are evergreen, terrestrial herbs with crowded pseudobulbs just below the surface of the soil and a few large, pleated leaves. The flowering stem emerges from a pseudoblulb and bears medium-sized, colourful flowers. The flowers open widely with the sepals and petals all similar in size to each other, although with the petals usually broader, the sepals are hairy on the outside. The labellum has three lobes, the side lobes more or less upright and the middle lobe with a claw near its base.

Taxonomy and naming
The genus Spathoglottis was first formally described in 1825 by Carl Ludwig Blume who published the description in Bijdragen tot de flora van Nederlandsch Indië. The genus name Spathoglottis is derived from the Greek spathe, spathe, and glotta, tongue, a probable reference to the broad labellum midlobe".

Species list
Species accepted by the World Checklist of Selected Plant Families as of October 2018 are:

 Spathoglottis affinis de Vriese
 Spathoglottis albida Kraenzl.
 Spathoglottis alpina R.S.Rogers
 Spathoglottis altigena Schltr.
 Spathoglottis aurea Lindl.
 Spathoglottis bulbosa Schltr.
 Spathoglottis carolinensis Schltr.
 Spathoglottis chrysantha Ames
 Spathoglottis chrysodorus T.Green
 Spathoglottis confusa J.J.Sm.
 Spathoglottis doctorsii J.J.Sm.
 Spathoglottis doctorsii var. doctorsii
 Spathoglottis doctorsii var. emarginata J.J.Sm.
 Spathoglottis eburnea Gagnep.
 Spathoglottis elmeri Ames
 Spathoglottis elobulata J.J.Sm.
 Spathoglottis erectiflora Kraenzl.
 Spathoglottis gracilis Rolfe ex Hook.f.
 Spathoglottis grandifolia Schltr.
 Spathoglottis hardingiana C.S.P.Parish & Rchb.f.
 Spathoglottis ixioides (D.Don) Lindl.
 Spathoglottis kenejiae Schltr.
 Spathoglottis kimballiana Hook.f.
 Spathoglottis kimballiana var. angustifolia Ames
 Spathoglottis kimballiana var. antiquensis T.Green
 Spathoglottis kimballiana var. kimballiana Spathoglottis latifolia (Gaudich.) Garay & Ormerod
 Spathoglottis microchilina Kraenzl.
 Spathoglottis micronesiaca Schltr.
 Spathoglottis oreophila Ridl.
 Spathoglottis pacifica Rchb.f.
 Spathoglottis palawanensis Lubag-Arquiza
 Spathoglottis papuana F.M.Bailey
 Spathoglottis papuana var. papuana Spathoglottis papuana var. puberifloraR.S.Rogers & C.T.White
 Spathoglottis × parsonii Ames & Quisumb.
 Spathoglottis parviflora Kraenzl.
 Spathoglottis paulinae F.Muell.
 Spathoglottis petri Rchb.f.
 Spathoglottis philippinensis Lubag-Arquiza
 Spathoglottis plicata Blume
 Spathoglottis portus-finschii Kraenzl.
 Spathoglottis pubescens Lindl.
 Spathoglottis pulchra Schltr.
 Spathoglottis pacifica Rchb.f.
 Spathoglottis smithii Kores
 Spathoglottis stenophylla Ridl.
 Spathoglottis sulawesiensis T.Green
 Spathoglottis tomentosa Lindl.
 Spathoglottis tricallosa J.J.Sm.
 Spathoglottis umbraticola Garay
 Spathoglottis unguiculata (Labill.) Rchb.f.
 Spathoglottis vanoverberghii Ames
 Spathoglottis vanvuurenii J.J.Sm.
 Spathoglottis velutina Schltr.
 Spathoglottis wariana Schltr.

Distribution and habitatSpathoglottis'' orchids usually grow in moist places in forest, grassland and swamps, usually in bright sunshine. They are found in India, China, the Philippines, Malaysia, Indonesia, New Guinea, New Caledonia, the Solomon Islands, Borneo and Cape York Peninsula in Australia. One species is endemic to Australia and three to China.

Use in horticulture
They are easy to cultivate and sought after for their large colourful flowers, and are common in tropical gardens. They need sun for part of the day, well-drained loamy soil and regular water.

References

External links
 

 
Collabieae genera